The 1956 Southern Area League was the third season of the regional third tier/division of speedway racing in the United Kingdom British teams. Brafield Flying Foxes were no longer competitors with Southern Rovers taking their place. Southern Rovers had no track and raced all their 'home' fixtures on away tracks.

Summary
Rye House Roosters were the champions for the second consecutive season. Vic Ridgeon of Rye House topped the averages.

Although the Southern Area League continued, it became the second tier division instead of the third tier division. There was not another third division of British speedway until 1996 when the Conference was inaugurated.

Final table

Leading Averages

See also
List of United Kingdom Speedway League Champions
Knockout Cup (speedway)

References

Southern Area League
1956 in speedway